The Fundamental Laws of the Kingdom were a set of  constitutional laws organizing the powers of the Francoist regime in Spain, the dictatorship of Generalissimo Francisco Franco. In 1977, during the transition, an eighth law with the same status as the others was brought into effect, altering the legislative framework in order to bring to a head the process of political reform.

The Fundamental Laws were ultimately revoked by the Spanish Constitution of 1978.

The eight laws were:

1. The  of 1938: Influenced by the Italian Labour Charter of 1927, it regulated the labour conditions and economic life of Spain. Though it established a minimum wage and limits on the length of the working day, these concessions were subordinate to the national interest.

2. The  of 1942: Created with an eye to a coming Allied victory in World War II. It recreated the Cortes as a limited instrument of collaboration, for creating and promulgating new laws. The first Cortes of Francoist Spain was inaugurated on 18 July 1942.

3. The  of 1945: Fixed the rights and duties of the Spanish people. One intent was to convey an impression of formal democratisation to the Potsdam Conference.

4. The  of 1945: Established the use of referendums to settle important points. The Law of Succession made it obligatory to hold a referendum to change the fundamental laws.

5. The Law of Succession to the Headship of the State of 1947: Regulated the Succession; the monarchy of Spain was de jure restored. Franco would remain head of state for life. Created the Council of the Realm and the Council of the Regency. The law was approved by a referendum on 6 July 1947.

6. The  of 1958: Established some organising principles for the judiciary of Franco's Spain, and enshrined into law the principles of Francoism per se.

7. The Organic Law of the State of 1967: Enumerated the ends of the state and fixed the powers and duties of the Head of State, as well as creating formally the office of Chief of Government. The law was approved by a referendum on 14 December 1966.

8. The Law for Political Reform of 1977: Political reform was begun in 1976. This law established the minimum conditions for the election of a new Cortes by universal suffrage, and authorised it to carry out the constitutional reforms of the transition. The law was approved by a referendum on 15 December 1976. Thus, in the State's time of rupture, the existing legal structures were used to create a parliamentary monarchy.

See also 
 Basic Laws of Israel, a similar set of de facto constitutional laws enacted in place of a constitution.

Bibliography 
 «El franquismo» Leyes fundamentales del Estado franquista. Infoguerracivil.com. Consultado el 31 de agosto de 2009.

External links 
 Labour Charter (1938) 
 Law Constituting the Cortes (1942) 
 Charter of the Spanish (1945) 
 National Referendum Law (1945) 
 Law of Leadership Succession (1947) 
 Law of the Principles of the National Movement (1958) 
 Organic Law of the State (1967) 
 Fundamental Laws of the Realm 

Law of Spain
Francoist Spain
Legal history of Spain
Constitutions of Spain